is a tokusatsu superhero-drama television series. It is the eighth installment in the Kamen Rider series and a co-production between Ishimori Productions and Toei. The series aired on the Mainichi Broadcasting System and the Tokyo Broadcasting System from October 4, 1987, to October 9, 1988. For distribution purposes, Toei refers to this television series as Black Kamen Rider.

The series has spawned a manga adaptation that ran in Shōnen Sunday during its broadcast; a direct sequel, Kamen Rider Black RX, in 1988; and a remake, Kamen Rider Black Sun, in 2022.

Synopsis

The Creation King, the pinnacle of the cult Gorgom. As his life begins to extinguish, the elected Creation King will inherit his power. On the night of their 19th birthday, stepbrothers Kotaro Minami and Nobuhiko Akizuki were kidnapped by Gorgom and submitted to a mutant cyborg surgery to become the candidates for the next Gorgom Creation King. Both of them are called Century Kings and are destined to best each other in a final battle - whoever wins will become the next Creation King. Kotaro escaped before getting brainwashed (which is the final step in the surgery), with help from his foster father, and turned against Gorgom. He soon finds out the horrific truth from his stepfather: Gorgom originally killed his true parents and, since both Kotaro and Nobuhiko were born on the day of a solar eclipse, are referred to as "Black Sun" and "Shadow Moon". Kotaro, taking on the name of Kamen Rider Black, was determined to rescue his stepbrother from Gorgom while protecting Japan. However, later in the series, Nobuhiko emerged as Shadow Moon to fight Kotaro with the survivor becoming the next Creation King.

Episodes
  (Original Airdate: October 4, 1987)
  (Original Airdate: October 11, 1987)
  (Original Airdate: October 18, 1987)
  (Original Airdate: October 25, 1987)
  (Original Airdate: November 1, 1987)
  (Original Airdate: November 8, 1987)
  (Original Airdate: November 15, 1987)
  (Original Airdate: November 22, 1987)
  (Original Airdate: November 29, 1987)
  (Original Airdate: December 6, 1987)
  (Original Airdate: December 13, 1987)
  (Original Airdate: December 20, 1987)
  (Original Airdate: December 27, 1987)
  (Original Airdate: January 10, 1988)
  (Original Airdate: January 17, 1988)
  (Original Airdate: January 24, 1988)
  (Original Airdate: January 31, 1988)
  (Original Airdate: February 7, 1988)
  (Original Airdate: February 14, 1988)
  (Original Airdate: February 21, 1988)
  (Original Airdate: February 28, 1988)
  (Original Airdate: March 6, 1988)
  (Original Airdate: March 13, 1988)
  (Original Airdate: March 20, 1988)
  (Original Airdate: April 3, 1988)
  (Original Airdate: April 10, 1988)
  (Original Airdate: April 17, 1988)
  (Original Airdate: April 24, 1988)
  (Original Airdate: May 1, 1988)
  (Original Airdate: May 8, 1988)
  (Original Airdate: May 15, 1988)
  (Original Airdate: May 22, 1988)
  (Original Airdate: May 29, 1988)
  (Original Airdate: June 5, 1988)
  (Original Airdate: June 12, 1988)
  (Original Airdate: June 19, 1988)
  (Original Airdate: June 26, 1988)
  (Original Airdate: July 3, 1988)
  (Original Airdate: July 10, 1988)
  (Original Airdate: July 17, 1988)
  (Original Airdate: July 24, 1988)
  (Original Airdate: July 31, 1988)
  (Original Airdate: August 7, 1988)
  (Original Airdate: August 14, 1988)
  (Original Airdate: August 21, 1988)
  (Original Airdate: August 28, 1988)
  (Original Airdate: September 4, 1988)
  (Original Airdate: September 11, 1988)
  (Original Airdate: September 18, 1988)
  (Original Airdate: October 2, 1988)
  (Original Airdate: October 9, 1988)

Related media

TV specials
1987:  - It was broadcast one week before the first episode, and introduces the character Kamen Rider Black.
1988:  - It covers all the heroes, from Kamen Rider 1 until ZX, and introduces Kamen Rider Black RX.

Theatrical films

 Released on March 12, 1988 (between episodes 22 and 23) as part of the Toei Manga Matsuri film festival. Originally known simply as Kamen Rider Black during its theatrical release. Children all over Tokyo mysteriously disappear without warning. Kotaro suspects that the Gorgom are behind the abductions and follows a suspicious-looking tour bus with children on it, only to lose its trail off a cliff. With the help of a fisherman (played by Ishinomori himself), Kotaro travels to a remote island and uses his abilities as Kamen Rider Black to save the kids and foil Gorgom's latest evil scheme.

 Released on July 9, 1988 (between episodes 38 and 39) as part of the Toei Manga Matsuri film festival. The city of Yūbari, Hokkaidō has become a ghost town following the presence of Shadow Moon and his minions of Gorgom. Makino, a scientist working on Gorgom's top-secret robot experiment, escapes from the evil organization and returns to Tokyo, only to find out that his wife and daughter have been abducted. As Kamen Rider Black, Kotaro travels to Yubari to save Makino's family and liberate the town from Shadow Moon's evil grasp.

Tetsuo Kurata reprised his role as Kotaro Minami in 2009's Kamen Rider Decade The Movie: All Riders vs. Dai-Shocker.

 Kurata also returned as Kotaro Minami in 2015's Super Hero Taisen GP: Kamen Rider 3.

Video games

A side-scrolling action game released by Bandai for the Family Computer Disk System on April 15, 1988. The player takes control of Kamen Rider Black, who must defeat numerous Gorgom mutants. The player got to ride Battle Hopper in addition to controlling Black on foot.

Kamen Rider Black appears as the main character of the 1988 storyline in this 3D action game for the PlayStation 2. Lead to an old Shocker hideout believing it to be Gorgom, Kotaro is forced to fight various kaijin and Gel-Shocker soldiers, only to learn the game's true villain is after the King Stone inside of him. Eventually, Kamen Rider 1, Kamen Rider V3 and Kamen Rider Agito travel to 1988 to assist him in the game's final battle. Tetsuo Kurata returns to voice the character. Shadow Moon makes a brief cameo as a non-playable character as well.

Kamen Rider Black Sun
 is an upcoming reboot of Kamen Rider Black, to be broadcast as part of the Kamen Rider 50th Anniversary Project.

The reboot was announced at a press conference on April 3, 2021, with Kazuya Shiraishi heading the project as director. The series was announced to release in spring 2022, with a worldwide release being considered. The show's staff was confirmed in October 2021, with Izumi Takahashi as a screenwriter, Shinji Higuchi as a concept designer, and Kiyotaka Taguchi as special effects director. The first visual of the show was slated to be revealed the following month. The show's two leading actors were confirmed in November 2021, with Hidetoshi Nishijima as Kotaro Minami/Kamen Rider Black Sun and Tomoya Nakamura as Nobuhiko Akizuki/Kamen Rider Shadow Moon.

In other media
Kamen Rider Black is pictured on the cover art of Powerman 5000's 1994 EP, True Force.

Cast

 Tetsuo Kurata as 
 Jiro Okamoto as Kamen Rider Black (actor suit)
 Takahito Horiuchi as 
 Tokio Iwata as Century King Shadow Moon (actor suit)
 Masaki Terasoma as 
 Akemi Inoue as 
 Ayumi Taguchi as 
 Hitomi Yoshii as 
 Susumu Kurobe as 
 Jun Yoshida as 
 Takeshi Watabe as 
 Shōzō Iizuka as 
 Toshimichi Takahashi as 
 Kiyoshi Kobayashi (1-39) and Issei Masamune (40-51) as the Narrator

Guest actors
 Kantarō Suga as Soichiro Akizuki
 Sent Hoshi as 
 Yutaka Hirose as Hayami
 Ryōsuke Sakamoto as Morita
 Miyuki Nagato as Gorgom Henchwoman
 Jōji Nakata as Shigeru Sugiyama
 Masaki Kyomoto as 
 Kouji Unogi as Buffalo Mutant (Human Form)
 Hiroko Nishimoto as Kimie Tadokoro
 Mayumi Yoshida
 Masashi Ishibashi as Saburo Takasugi
 Shun Ueda as Kuwagata Mutant (Human Form)
 Eisuke Yoda as

Songs
Opening theme

Lyrics: 
Composition: 
Arrangement: 
Artist: Tetsuo Kurata

Ending theme
"Long Long Ago, 20th Century"
Lyrics: Yoko Aki
Composition: Ryudo Uzaki
Arrangement: Eiji Kawamura
Artist: Norio Sakai

International broadcast
It aired in Thailand in 1990 on Saturday before noon on Channel 3, dubbed as weera burut nakak dam. ("วีรบุรุษหน้ากากดำ", literally: Black Mask Hero).
It was broadcast in the Philippines every Sunday from 1993 to 1998 via IBC-13 and was one of the highest-rated TV shows of that time, translated to Filipino.
The series aired in Indonesia from 1993 to 1994 on RCTI and from 2004 to 2006 on Indosiar. It was known as Ksatria Baja Hitam which means The Black Steel Knight and has received a cult following since. The series was return to air in 2020 on RTV under the title Masked Rider Black (which is the title used by Toei for international distribution as well).
It was the first of the two series of the Kamen Rider franchise to be broadcast in Brazil (the other being Kamen Rider Black RX), by the now-extinct network Rede Manchete from April 1991 to July 1994, and was also released on home video. The last episode (51 - Gorgom's Last Day) was never shown. Even with the title of Black Kamen Rider adopted by the dubbing and early TV promos, the series was announced later as Blackman, which was also used for the toy line and the Brazilian soundtrack album. Rerun in the year 2010 on the channel Ulbra TV. Returns briefly on August 30, 2020, on Band network, with the broadcasting of the first two episodes only. After a dispute over dubbing rights, the series was canceled in the following week.
The series was licensed by Discotek Media for Blu-Ray in the US It was announced during the Spooktacular” Discotek Day stream on October 25, 2022, and was released on February 28, 2023.

References

External links 

 仮面ライダーBLACK | 仮面ライダーWEB【公式】｜東映 (Kamen Rider Black page on official website)

Black
Dark fantasy television series
Japanese fantasy television series
1987 Japanese television series debuts
1988 Japanese television series endings
Mainichi Broadcasting System original programming
Japanese drama television series
1980s Japanese television series